The Taxation Administration (DOT) is the agency of the Ministry of Finance of Taiwan (ROC) responsible for tax collections in Taiwan.

History
The Taxation Administration was originally established as Taxation Agency in May 1950.

Responsibilities
 Drafting, revising and interpreting inland tax regulations
 Planning, directing, supervising and evaluating the levy and collection of national tax administrations and local tax administrations
 Directing, supervising and evaluating the anti-corruption efforts of all levels of tax administration
 Auditing of major tax evasion cases, and supervising and evaluating the audit performance of all levels of tax administration
 Planning and evaluating matters relating to tax administration, and tax information
 Promoting tax-related education and publicity campaigns

Organizational structure
 Income Tax Division
 Consumption Tax Division
 Property Tax Division
 Inspection Division
 Tax Auditing Division
 Tax Collection Administrative Division
 Secretariat
 Personnel Office
 Civil Service and Ethics Office
 Accounting and Statistics Office

Transportation
NTA is accessible from Jingmei Station of the Taipei Metro.

See also
 Ministry of Finance (Taiwan)

References

Further reading 
 Vazquez-Caro, J., & Bird, R. M. (2011). Benchmarking tax administrations in developing countries: A systemic approach, International Center for Public Policy Working Paper Series, at AYSPS, GSU paper1104, International Center for Public Policy, Andrew Young School of Policy Studies, Georgia State University.

External links
 

1950 establishments in Taiwan
Executive Yuan
Revenue services
Taxation in Taiwan